The Bride Test is a 2019 romance novel written by Helen Hoang.

References

American romance novels
2019 novels